Rod or Rød is a surname. Notable people with the surname include:

 Edouard Rod (1857–1910), French-Swiss novelist
 Johnny Rod (born 1957), American bass guitar player

See also
 Rød (surname)
 Rodd